Marc Stuart Jones (born April 1972) is a British politician, and the current Police and Crime Commissioner for Lincolnshire, representing the Conservative Party.

He was elected to the post on 5 May 2016, succeeding the previous incumbent, Alan Hardwick. Following his election Jones chose Stuart Tweedale as his deputy, but Lincolnshire's Police and Crime Panel did not endorse the appointment. Jones announced on 8 June 2016 that he would appoint Tweedale to the post despite the Panel's opposition. Jones was re-elected in 2021 with a 57.9% majority - securing 102,813 of the 177,528 votes cast. On January 1, 2022, Philip Clark replaced Tweedale in the role of Deputy PCC.

In July 2021 Jones was elected as the chair of Association of Police and Crime Commissioners and in on January 1, 2023, joined the board of the College of Policing after the appointment was confirmed by Home Secretary Suella Braverman.

He is also a director of The Police Arboretum Memorial Trust.

Before his election as Police and Crime Commissioner, Jones had been deputy leader of the City of Lincoln Council, and Executive Councillor for Finance and Property at Lincolnshire County Council. He also stood as the Conservative candidate for the Great Grimsby constituency in the 2015 general election finishing second with 8,874 votes (26%).

Marc is the author of a book about the history of the fishing industry in Grimsby.

References

Living people
Police and crime commissioners in England
Conservative Party police and crime commissioners
Conservative Party (UK) councillors
Members of Lincolnshire County Council
1972 births